Perfluorodecanoic acid (PFDA) is a fluorosurfactant and has been used in industry, with applications as wetting agent and flame retardant.

It was recently linked to health concerns, like other fluorosurfactants, leading to proposed restrictions on its use. In 2020, a California bill banned its use as an intentionally added ingredient in cosmetics.

It has been proposed as a chemical probe to study peroxisome proliferation.

References 

Perfluorocarboxylic acids
Pollutants
Anionic surfactants